Willi Kund (11 March 1908 – 30 August 1967) was a German international footballer.

References

1908 births
1967 deaths
Association football forwards
German footballers
Germany international footballers
1. FC Nürnberg players